William Earl Stein (May 28, 1899August 27, 1983) was a professional American football offensive lineman in the National Football League. He played seven seasons for the Duluth Kelleys/Eskimos (1923–1927) and the Chicago Cardinals (1928–1929).

References

1899 births
1983 deaths
People from Two Harbors, Minnesota
Players of American football from Minnesota
American football offensive linemen
Macalester College alumni
Fordham Rams football players
Duluth Kelleys players
Duluth Eskimos players
Chicago Cardinals players